Frank Van De Vijver (born 12 November 1962) is a Belgian former professional racing cyclist. He rode in the 1987 Tour de France.

References

External links
 

1962 births
Living people
Belgian male cyclists
People from Bornem
Cyclists from Antwerp Province